State Correctional Institution – Mercer is a minimum-security correctional facility near Mercer in the northwestern part of the commonwealth of Pennsylvania.

History
Originally housing inmates from the 14 northwestern Pennsylvania counties. In 1986, the facility also accepted inmates from the southwestern 9-county region that were utilizing SCI-Greensburg. Presently, inmates from all over the commonwealth are housed at SCI Mercer.

Physical Plant
There are 30 buildings on SRCF Mercer's Campus (23 inside the 37.5 acre fenced perimeter). The campus is air-conditioned (electric system). Nine diesel backup generators serve as emergency power. The institution operates its own sewage treatment plant, having a 104,000 gallon daily capacity.

See also
 List of Pennsylvania state prisons

References

Prisons in Pennsylvania
Buildings and structures in Mercer County, Pennsylvania